The Billboard China Airplay/FL was a record chart published weekly by Billboard China  that measured the airplay of foreign language songs in China, based on audience impressions from a panel of radio stations compiled by Nielsen-CCData.

List of number one songs

See also 
Billboard China
Billboard China Top 100

References

External links
 

Chinese record charts
Billboard charts
2019 establishments in China